Paraprenanthes is a genus of East Asian plants in the tribe Cichorieae within the family Asteraceae, most of the species found only in China.

 Species

References

Asteraceae genera
Cichorieae